Jaws is an amusement ride attraction based on the Jaws film series and is located at Universal Studios Japan. It originally opened at Universal Studios Florida in Orlando in 1990, and another installation later opened at Universal Studios Japan in 2001. The ride uses tour boats to take guests through a harbor of the fictional Amity Island, which begins as a leisurely tour that is abruptly interrupted by an attack of the famous great white shark. The concept is an expanded version of the Jaws miniature attraction featured in the Studio Tour at Universal Studios Hollywood in California. In 2012, the attraction was removed from the Florida theme park to make room for the second phase of expansion for The Wizarding World of Harry Potter.

History
The original attraction at Universal Studios Florida was inspired by a small attraction on the long-running Studio Tour at Universal Studios Hollywood, in which the Studio Tour tram passed through several sets from the film and was then attacked by an animatronic shark known as Jaws while driving by the Amity Harbor shoreline. This attraction opened in 1976 and continues to operate to this day. For the Universal Studios Florida park/studio project, Universal sought to take the components of the Hollywood tram stop and turn it into its own ride. The original ride was designed by MCA/Universal Planning and Development, in association with Ride & Show Engineering, Inc., which designed the original tour scene. Steven Spielberg, who directed the first film in the series, also served as a creative consultant for the ride.

Following the opening of Jaws within the park on June 7, 1990, it experienced extensive and persistent breakdowns as a result of the elaborate special effects involved, as did fellow original rides Kongfrontation and Earthquake: The Big One. However, while Universal was able to eventually contain the technical bugs in the Kong and Earthquake rides at "utmost consistency", the effects in the Jaws ride constantly refused to work at all, resulting in the ride having to be evacuated almost daily. Following the Summer opening of the park, Universal temporarily shut down the ride in August 1990 and sued Ride & Show Engineering, Inc. for failing to properly design the ride. Throughout 1991 and early 1992, Universal attempted to refurbish the effects of the ride for an eventual re-opening, but with no success. Some reports leaked that the high-tech electronics used in the sharks were damaged due to inadequate waterproofing.

Eventually, Universal collaborated with Totally Fun Company, ITEC Entertainment, Intamin and Oceaneering International, who together installed an entirely new ride system and special effects to create an almost entirely new version of the ride. Some of the changes, which resulted in a re-design of the ride, included the replacement of two major ride scenes; the first being where Jaws bit onto the tour boat and turned it by 180-degrees (which was replaced with a Gas dock explosion scene); and the second being the finale, which was originally loosely based on the first Jaws where the skipper shot an air tank in the shark's mouth with a rifle, causing it to explode underwater (which was replaced by a finale loosely based on the ending for Jaws 2 where the shark was electrocuted after biting onto an underwater cable attached to a high-voltage barge). Oceaneering provided the animatronic shark for the redesigned ride, their first theme park-based project. The ride was then officially re-opened by Roy Scheider, Lorraine Gary and Steven Spielberg in Spring of 1993.

On March 31, 2001, Jaws officially opened at Universal Studios Japan. The ride system for the attraction was developed by MTS Systems Corporation.

Following the hurricanes that struck Central Florida in 2004, Universal was forced to temporarily close the ride in January 2005 due to the rising cost of petroleum, which was used to fuel the numerous pyrotechnical effects throughout the attraction as well as the tour boats. The ride finally reopened in December 2005, but was listed as "seasonal" and only open on busier days. This lasted until February 2007 when the ride was finally opened full-time again after numerous guest complaints. During the 2005 closure, several renovations were made to the ride. The attraction was further refurbished every year from 2008-2011.

On December 2, 2011, Universal Orlando Resort announced that the Jaws attraction along with the entire Amity area of Universal Studios Florida would close permanently on January 2, 2012, to "make room for an exciting, NEW, experience." (the second phase of The Wizarding World of Harry Potter.) Severe backlash followed after the announcement. The attraction officially closed on January 2, 2012, at 9:00 pm with Michael Skipper aka "Skip" giving the final voyage to the last lucky group of 48 guests. By the next morning, the entire Amity area was walled off and completely demolished in the following months. The hanging shark statue from the town square remains as a tribute to the ride and can be found in the Fisherman's Wharf area of the San Francisco section of the park. The attraction remains open at Universal Studios Japan as well as the original tram stop at Universal Studios Hollywood.

Ride synopsis

After the shark nicknamed as Jaws was eventually destroyed by Chief Brody, Matt Hooper and Quint in 1974, Brody became a legend in Amity Harbor, and the "Jaws" incident inspired Steven Spielberg's big Hollywood movie. However, tourism on Amity Island strongly decreased following the incident due to a fear of sharks. However, resident seaman Jake Grundy decided to open a new boat tour on the island which would take guests out to the historic areas where the shark attacks actually occurred, which ultimately brought back tourism to the island.

Queue
As guests enter Captain Jake's Amity Boat Tours, they walk through a series of boathouses located near Amity Harbor, which hold various fishing supplies, nautical artifacts and feature numerous overhead television monitors that are tuned to Amity's local TV station, WJWS13: The Station That BITES (which also has the tagline "The station that plays the hits"). The station features a low-budget local talk show entitled "Hey There, Amity!", children's and news programming, ads for local businesses, and promos for classic movies and television shows, many of them from the Universal library. Upon reaching the end of the queue, guests are loaded onto one of Captain Jake's tour boats.

Ride
After boarding the tour boat, guests learn that they are taking a guided scenic cruise to visit the actual locations of the shark attacks that occurred during that fateful summer of 1974, which were made famous in a popular Hollywood movie that was made not long afterward. The tour boat is piloted by one of Captain Jake's skippers and is protected by an army surplus 40mm grenade launcher. However, guests are reassured by their skipper that they won't need to use it because no one has seen a shark in the area since 1974.

The tour begins in Amity Harbor as the tour boat passes the homes of Chief Brody, Mayor Larry Vaughn, and various harbor side businesses. As the tour boat approaches a lighthouse situated on top of a rocky jetty, the tour is suddenly interrupted by a radio distress call from a fellow tour boat skipper named Gordon. His call for help turns into screams of horror, followed by mysterious silence. As the skipper contacts the home base in an attempt to find out what is going on with Gordon's boat, the tour boat crosses the jetty to reveal the remains of Gordon's tour boat, Amity 3, sinking under the water.

Suddenly, a dorsal fin appears out of the water, the fin of what appears to be a great white shark. The fin submerges and swims under the tour boat, rocking it back and forth. Worried, the skipper pulls out the grenade launcher as the dorsal fin rises out of the water on the starboard. Not realizing that it is actually loaded, the skipper fires at the shark, but misses. They try firing the second shot but miss again as the fin sinks back beneath the surface of the water.

The skipper then comes up with the idea to try to hide the tour boat in a nearby boathouse and wait for Chief Brody's arrival. As the skipper brings the tour boat to a stop inside the boathouse and looks for somewhere to tie it up, a sound is heard somewhere near the back of the boathouse. As the nervous skipper tries to figure out what it was, a loud crashing noise breaks the silence as the walls of the boathouse begin to shake. The skipper realizes that the shark is barging itself against the outside of the boathouse trying to break in. The skipper starts to drive off but is unable to get the tour boat to drop into gear. After several tense seconds of fighting with the tour boat's throttle, the skipper finally gets it to drop into gear just as the shark finally breaks a hole through the wall and surfaces inside of the boathouse, grazing the side of the tour boat.

As the tour boat leaves the boathouse, the skipper is informed by Chief Brody over the radio that he'll be there in ten minutes. The skipper replies with "we'll be shark bait in ten minutes" and picks up the grenade launcher again, just as the shark attacks the tour boat near Bridewell's Gas Dock. Unfortunately, the next grenade that the skipper fires strike the nearby gas dock, which erupts into flames, threatening to engulf the tour boat and its passengers. However, the skipper manages to pilot an escape before the flames reach the tour boat.

As a last resort, the skipper decides to unload everyone at an old fishing pier that happens to be located near a high voltage barge. But just as they reach the pier, the shark's fin reappears heading straight for the tour boat. Suddenly, the shark emerges right next to the tour boat but accidentally bites down onto a submerged power cable from the barge and electrocutes itself. The smell of roasted shark fills the air as the shark disappears into a cloud of steam that engulfs the tour boat. As the steam cloud clears, the burnt corpse of the shark resurfaces and makes one final lunge at the tour boat. But the skipper immediately takes one last shot at it with the grenade launcher and finally hits it, decimating the shark. 

Despite the skipper being praised for bringing peace once again to Amity Island with cheers from the guests, the skipper wants to keep it a secret between them so that fish companies won't hear about it and the guests agree. Afterward, the skipper brings the guests back to the dock safely where they disembark and exit the attraction.

Incident
In July 1990, a 39-year-old man fell into the water while riding after a boat railing allegedly broke. According to his lawyer, guests applauded as he was pulled back into the boat, having assumed the incident was part of the ride. There were no serious injuries, and he sued Universal for $1 million claiming negligence and poor maintenance.

See also

List of amusement rides based on film franchises
2012 in amusement parks

References

External links
Jaws at Universal Studios Japan
Video of the Jaws ride
Jaws ride information

Jaws (franchise)
Water rides
Universal Studios Florida
Universal Studios Japan
Universal Parks & Resorts attractions by name
Amusement rides based on film franchises
Animatronic attractions
Amusement rides manufactured by Intamin
Amusement rides manufactured by MTS Systems Corporation
Amusement rides manufactured by Ride & Show Engineering, Inc.
Amusement rides manufactured by Totally Fun Company